Davydovskoye is a rural locality (a selo) in Ilyinskoye Rural Settlement, Kolchuginsky District, Vladimir Oblast, Russia. The population was 121 as of 2010. There are 13 streets.

Geography 
Davydovskoye is located 12 km north of Kolchugino (the district's administrative centre) by road. Novoye is the nearest rural locality.

References 

Rural localities in Kolchuginsky District